Alimony is a lost 1917 American silent drama film directed by Emmett J. Flynn and starring Lois Wilson. An unknown Rudolph Valentino has a role as a supporting player.

Plot
As described in a film magazine, Bernice Bristol Flint (Whittell), an attractive grass widow (a woman divorced or separated from her husband), associates herself intimately with a number of divorce attorneys who live well on their percentage from unscrupulously secured divorces carrying a large alimony. She is interested in young clubman Howard Turner (Fischer), who has not remained devoted to her during the period of her latest divorce. She is furious at his waning ardor and considers herself practically jilted as she plots revenge on him. She succeeds in interesting him in Marjorie (Wilson), a charming guest of hers, and soon brings about a marriage between the couple. Then, with the assistance of unprincipled lawyer Elijah Stone (Allardt), she separates the pair and begins to frame up a case against which no marital happiness could live. Many misunderstandings occur which make the couple miserable that cannot be explained. They continue to suffer until confederates of the divorcee and attorney turn state's evidence and the guilty man and woman are convicted. The bride and groom, greatly relieved, continue their honeymoon in peace and quiet.

Cast
 Lois Wilson as Marjorie Lansing
 George Fisher as Howard Turner
 Josephine Whittell as Bernice Bristol Flint
 Wallace Worsley as John Flint
 Arthur Allardt as Elijah Stone
 Joseph J. Dowling as William Jackson
 Ida Lewis as Mrs. Lansing
 Margaret Livingston as Florence (credited as Marguerite Livingston)

unbilled
 Alice Terry - Uncredited Extra
 Rudolph Valentino - Dancer

Reception
Like many American films of the time, Alimony was subject to cuts by city and state film censorship boards. For example, the Chicago Board of Censors cut a scene with a girl kicking her feet above the table.

See also
 List of lost films

References

External links

 
 
 Still of scene in the film with George Fisher and Lois Wilson (University of Washington, Sayre Collection)

1917 films
1910s English-language films
American silent feature films
Films directed by Emmett J. Flynn
Lost American films
1917 drama films
Silent American drama films
American black-and-white films
1917 lost films
Lost drama films
Censored films
1910s American films